The 2019 Stock Light is the sixteenth season of Stock Light.

Teams and drivers
All cars were powered by V8 engines and used the JL chassis. All drivers were Brazilian-registered.
{|
|

Race calendar and results
The 2019 calendar was announced on December 20, 2018.

References

External links
 Official website

Stock Car Brasil
Stock Light